Curt Brian Apsey (born 1962) is an American sports administrator who was the athletic director of Boise State University from 2015 to 2020. He joined the San Diego State athletic department in 2021.

Education
Apsey graduated from California Polytechnic State University in 1988 with a Bachelor of Science degree in physical education. He was a four-year starter for the men's soccer team, setting the school's career record for most goals scored (52).

Career 
Apsey began his career as the assistant coach of the Cal Poly Mustangs men's soccer team. Apsey worked as assistant director of development at California State University, Bakersfield from 1990 to 1994, then as assistant director of athletics at California State University, San Bernardino. 

From 1998 to 2014, Apsey worked as the as senior associate athletic director of Boise State University, including as interim athletic director for the final months of 2011. He was athletic director of Carroll College in Helena, Montana for one year, before returning to Boise State as athletic director on June 23, 2015. Apsey replaced Mark Coyle, who joined Syracuse University. Apsey's contract includes a base salary of $331,500 with additional incentives. In October 2020, it was announced that Apsey would leave his role as athletic director but remain at Boise State in a fundraising position. He was succeeded by Jeramiah Dickey.

Apsey was hired at SDSU in 2021.

Personal life
Apsey and his wife, Teresa, have two daughters.

See also
List of NCAA Division I athletic directors

References

External links
 Boise State profile

Living people
Cal Poly Mustangs men's soccer players
Boise State Broncos athletic directors
1962 births
Association footballers not categorized by position
Cal Poly Mustangs men's soccer coaches
California State University, Bakersfield faculty
California State University, San Bernardino faculty
Association football players not categorized by nationality